Danilo Tandang is a Filipino botanist (plant taxonomist), working in the National Museum of the Philippines, Philippines

Danilo Tandang is a main contributor for Co's Digital Flora of the Philippines, by Leonard Co.

He does research on the Philippine flowering plants.

Species described
Corybas kaiganganianus
Begonia normaaguilarae
Decaisnina tomentosa
Vaccinium carmesianum
Dischidia argentii 
Dischidia glabrata
Begonia burabod
Begonia tarangban
Begonia sohoton
Begonia benitotanii
Amylotheca cleofei
Hypericum perryongii
Corybas boholensis
Begonia truncatifolia
Begonia beijnenii
Begonia cabanillasii
Begonia droseroides
Begonia gabaldonensis
Begonia madulidii
Corybas circinatus
Dilochia deleoniae
Mycetia suedixieana
Mycetia dagohoyana
Timonius sulitii
Timonius noli-tangere
Ixora alejandroi
Hoya irisiae
Nepenthes barcelonae
Balanophora coralliformis
Begonia titoevangelistae
Rafflesia magnifica

Taxa named after D.N.Tandang
Begonia tandangii

References

External links
Google Scholar

20th-century Filipino botanists
Year of birth missing (living people)
Living people
Taxonomists